Ayman Safadi (Arabic: أيمن الصفدي ʾayman aṣ-ṣafadī) (born 15 January 1962) is a Jordanian politician who serves as Deputy Prime Minister and Minister of Foreign Affairs. 

Safadi is a member of the Jordanian Druze community.

Biography

Early life
Safadi was born in Zarqa, Jordan, on 15 January 1962. He holds a BA in English literature from Yarmouk University, and an MA in international journalism from Baylor University which he earned in 1992.

Journalism
He used to write in The Jordan Times. He has also served as CEO of Abu Dhabi Media Company, Director General of Jordan Radio and Television Corporation, editor-in-chief and columnist for the Al-Ghad daily newspaper, and editor-in-chief of The Jordan Times.

In 2015, Safadi was appointed as a member of the board of directors of the Al-Mamlaka TV channel.

He founded in 2014 and is the Chief Executive Officer of Path Arabia, a political and communication strategy company and consultancy that operates out of Abu Dhabi. It focuses on the Middle East.

Politics

Between 2008 and 2011, he served as an adviser to King Abdullah II at The Royal Hashemite Court, Deputy Prime Minister, Minister of State, and government spokesperson. 

Safadi was a member of the Jordanian Senate from September 2016 until his appointment as minister in 2017.

He also served as spokesperson for the United Nations Assistance Mission for Iraq (UNAMI).

Safadi was appointed Minister of Foreign Affairs on 15 January 2017, replacing Nasser Judeh. On 12 October 2021, he was also appointed Deputy Prime Minister in Bisher Al-Khasawneh's Cabinet.

In January 2022, Safadi met with United States Secretary of State Antony Blinken in Washington, D. C., to discuss bilateral relations, economic cooperation, and issues in the Middle East including Syrian crisis, two-state solution, and support of Iraq.

See also
List of foreign ministers in 2017

References

External links

 

1962 births
Living people
Baylor University alumni
Deputy prime ministers of Jordan
Foreign ministers of Jordan
Government ministers of Jordan
Members of the Senate of Jordan
People from Zarqa
Yarmouk University alumni